Andrija Drljo (born 6 September 2002) is a Bosnian professional footballer who plays as a winger for Bosnian Premier League club Željezničar and the Bosnia and Herzegovina U21 national team.

Born and raised in Bosnia and Herzegovina, he started his professional career at Hungarian club MTK Budapest, who loaned him to Szentlőrinc. In 2022, Drljo joined Bosnian Premier League club Zrinjski Mostar. In 2023, he signed for Željezničar.

Club career

Early career
Drljo signed his first professional contract with Hungarian side MTK Budapest in October 2020, and played for the club in the Nemzeti Bajnokság I. He was loaned to Szentlőrinc for the remainder of the 2021–22 season.

On 15 July 2022, Drljo joined Bosnian Premier League club Zrinjski Mostar. He made his debut for the club in a 4–1 home win against Sarajevo on 4 September 2022.

Željezničar
On 19 January 2023, Drljo joined Željezničar on a two-and-a-half-year deal. He debuted and scored his first goal for the club in a Bosnian Cup game against Leotar on 18 February 2023.

International career
Drljo is a member of the Bosnia and Herzegovina national under-21 team. He has represented Bosnia and Herzegovina at all youth levels.

Career statistics

Club

References

External links

2002 births
Living people
Sportspeople from Mostar
Bosnia and Herzegovina footballers
Bosnia and Herzegovina youth international footballers
Bosnia and Herzegovina under-21 international footballers
Association football wingers
MTK Budapest FC players
Szentlőrinci SE footballers
HŠK Zrinjski Mostar players
FK Željezničar Sarajevo players
Nemzeti Bajnokság I players
Nemzeti Bajnokság II players
Premier League of Bosnia and Herzegovina players
Bosnia and Herzegovina expatriate footballers
Expatriate footballers in Croatia
Expatriate footballers in Hungary
Bosnia and Herzegovina expatriate sportspeople in Croatia
Bosnia and Herzegovina expatriate sportspeople in Hungary